This is a list of notable wedding chapels located in Las Vegas, with the area defined broadly as the Las Vegas Valley. 

According to a travel magazine source in 2023, these chapels have "iconic appeal" and there are about 50 on or near the Las Vegas strip alone.

References

 
Wedding chapels
Wedding chapels